Ali Partovi (born 1972) is an Iranian-American entrepreneur and angel investor. He is best known as a co-founder of Code.org (which he founded with his twin brother Hadi), iLike, LinkExchange, an early advisor at Dropbox, and an early promoter of bid-based search advertising. Partovi currently serves on the board of directors at FoodCorps. He is currently the CEO of Neo, a mentorship community and venture fund he established in 2017.

Early life and education 
Ali Partovi was born alongside his twin brother Hadi Partovi amid the White Revolution of Iran and the Iran-Iraq war. Both his parents were intellectuals. His mother studied Computer Science in Boston, and his father Firouz Partovi was a founding member of the Sharif University of Technology and the second employed professor. His father influenced Ali and Hadi to care about education and found code.org and Neo.

Ali and Hadi began coding when they were ten on a Commodore 64 their father had brought from a seminar he had attended abroad. The family fled to the United States during the Iranian Revolution. Ali and Hadi both went on to acquire both Bachelor’s and Master's Degrees in Computer Science from Harvard University, where they were members of Sigma Chi.

Career

Oracle 
Ali Partovi worked as a Software Consultant at Oracle from August 1994 to April 1996. He worked on the Interactive Tv project as a field engineer, helping deploy trials for telco and cable companies.

LinkExchange 
Ali Partovi joined Tony Hsieh and Sanjay Mandan in 1996 to co-partner in the establishment of the internet company LinkExchange. The three were later joined by Alfred Lin who served as CFO. Ali says that he was recruited for his computer programming skills and his business management skills. He worked in sales, marketing, finance, and business development until Microsoft acquired the company in 1998 for $265 million. At the time, LinkExchange reached 400,000 sites and about 21 million consumers.

Partovi was one of the first people to recognize the paid search opportunity because he saw how badly small business owners wanted their businesses to show up on search results. In 1998, LinkExchange acquired Submit It!, started by college-dropout Scott Bannister, which helped owners submit URLs to search engines. After Microsoft acquired LinkExchange, Partovi stayed with them and became the Lead Project Manager for MSN Keywords. However, executives in Microsoft, Yahoo, Excite, and other search companies had their hopes pinned in Banner Ads. When Microsoft viewed MSN Keywords as a threat to Banner Ads and shut it down in 2000, Partovi left.

iLike 
This online platform, meant to help users discover new artists spawned out of GarageBand. GarageBand was established in 1999 as a site where an independent artist could post their music, and other users would discover them. Ali had bought the assets of GarageBand in 2002 and had saved it from bankruptcy. When he and his brother attempted to re-invent the company, iLike was founded in 2006. Ali became CEO, and Hadi became President.

The service made use of a sidebar which made it easy for users to discover new artists. It became a massive success within the first few months of launching. Users could directly register on the platform or use third-party networks such as Facebook. iLike had a "post-once publish-everywhere" dashboard for artists.

iLike had raised funding pre-launch at a $50 million valuation. After 7 or 8 years, iLike was acquired by Myspace for $20 million.

Initially, Apple was interested in purchasing iLike because Jobs was impressed by the product and the team. However, Partovi cost the acquisition by telling Steve Jobs that they were worth three times as much as Jobs was offering ($50 million). When iLike did not have a competing offer, Jobs ended negotiations. Partovi refers to the Steve Jobs encounter as one of his "most painful memories".

Code.org 
Ali and Hadi created Code.org in 2013 as a non-profit initiative to promote computer science, and the two brothers funded the initiative. They believe that everyone in the world should be able to read and write code, yet many American public schools don't offer computer science classes. Ali and Hadi launched a short video featuring Mark Zuckerberg, Bill Gates, Jack Dorsey, and others to inspire kids to learn how to code. This video garnered over 15 million views on Youtube. Ali also helped establish Hour of Code, a tutorial that introduces students to programming.

Angel Investing 
From 1998 to 2017, Ali has backed major tech companies, including Facebook, Airbnb, Dropbox, Uber, and Zappos. Ali and his twin brother Hadi have been identified as the most prominent angel investors, with their portfolios having a very high number of now successful companies. They state that they fund people based on their tech talent. However, Ali stopped angel investing in 2017.

Although Partovi has backed many tech startups, in the beginning, he was afraid of investing in ventures he thought were terrible ideas. However, many of these companies turned out to be successful. One of such companies is Google. He was afraid of betting on a search engine since there was too much competition. Another missed opportunity was PayPal. Ali says, “I wish at that time someone had told me that, like, if one of the smartest people you know starts a company, just don't ask questions. Figure out how to invest in it.”

Once Ali was having lunch with a Wall Street journalist and Brian Chesky was at the table next to them. Brian propositioned Airbnb because he overheard that Ali was an angel investor, but Ali didn't follow up. This caused Ali to miss out on Airbnb as an early investor, but he was able to invest later at a higher valuation.

Neo 
In 2017, Ali Partovi founded Neo, a community of mentors meant to accelerate the development of leadership in the tech environment. Ali stopped Angel Investing around this time as this new company includes a venture fund. The company identifies top Computer Science students and accelerates their careers by introducing them and investing in their startups. It has $200 million in venture funds, over 1200 introductions to startups, 539 community members, and 57 portfolio companies.

The idea was born out of the pro-sports scouting premises. Ali observed how basketball agents and coaches scouted for the best players in varsities and high schools. In 2016, he had a conversation with Stephen Curry, who was in the Warriors then, and the idea of scouting tech engineers ceased being just a theory. He would identify the most brilliant engineers, recruit them, and introduce them to the mentorship community, made up of veteran technologists.

In one recorded session with recruits, Ali encourages them to avoid not taking risks. He illustrates the model he uses to determine the expected value by plotting the probability of success against the expected value. He states that the size of the reward matters than the probability of success. Reducing the risk may draw out the outcome of an identified opportunity, only resulting in a small success and a waste of a lot of resources and time. Spectacular failure or spectacular success constitutes good outcomes for Ali.

Writing 
Between 2000 and 2001, Ali wrote a screenplay with his friend Alan Shusterman. They traveled to LA to make connections, but had their luggage and laptops stolen instead.

In 2020, Ali wrote an article on Immigration policies. He highlights his experiences in America as an Iranian immigrant and proposes changes on immigration policies that he believes are detrimental to even America itself.

In 2021, Ali published an article in which he highlights the challenges that startups face when they are presented with acquisition deals. The article warns startup CEOs against taking hype too far.

Personal life 
Ali grew up playing the piano with his brother, and has since been shown to be an avid musician. He has also been shown to enjoy rock climbing and going to the gym.

As an immigrant himself, he is passionate about legislation affecting immigrant populations, including foreign and educational policies. He has claimed to have faced problems obtaining travel documents since his first job due to his Iranian heritage. He has spoken out about the restrictive consequences of the recent immigration bills passed in the United States. In his article, 'Immigrants are Humans,' Ali states how he and other immigrants had been deported as 12-year-olds and how such policies do not help anybody and hurt America.

As of 2019, Ali has four children from two marriages.

Ali's cousins include Dara Khosrowshahi, Amir Khosrowshahi (co-founder of Nervana Systems), and Farzad "Fuzzy" Khosrowshahi (co-founder XL2Web which was acquired to become Google Sheets).

References 

American computer businesspeople
American people of Iranian descent
Living people
People from Tehran
Harvard University alumni
American company founders
1972 births
21st-century American businesspeople